Brody is a city in Zolochiv Raion of Lviv Oblast (province) of western Ukraine. Brody hosts the administration of Brody urban hromada, one of the hromadas of Ukraine. Population: .

Brody is the junction of the Druzhba and Odessa–Brody oil pipelines.

History
The first mention of a settlement on the site of Brody is dated 1084 (Instructions by Vladimir Monomach). It is believed to have been destroyed by Batu Khan in 1241.

Polish Kingdom
From 1441 Brody was the property of different feudal families (Jan Sieniński; from 1511, Kamieniecki).

Brody was granted Magdeburg town rights by Polish King Stephen Báthory by virtue of a privilege issued in Lublin on 22 August 1584. It was named Lubicz after the Lubicz coat of arms of the founder, Stanisław Żółkiewski, one of the most accomplished military commanders in Polish history (not to be confused with Lubech, Lubecz). The king also set up three annual fairs. These privileges were confirmed by King Sigismund III Vasa in 1597 at the Warsaw Sejm. Already in documents from 1598 the city appeared under the name Brody. It was a private town of the Polish Crown, owned by houses of Żółkiewski, Koniecpolski and Potocki.

From the 17th century until the Holocaust the city was populated not only by Ruthenians and Poles, but also by a significant number of Jews (70% of the town's population), Armenians, and Greeks. From 1629, the city became the property of Stanisław Koniecpolski, another of the most distinguished military commanders in Polish history, who ordered the construction of the Brody Castle (1630–1635). The castle, or rather the fortress, was designed by the French military engineer Guillaume Le Vasseur de Beauplan. It was one of the strongest fortresses located on the route of frequent Tatar and Cossack invasions. King Władysław IV Vasa, wanting to reward and assist Koniecpolski in the construction of the fortress, issued a privilege in 1633 in Kraków, in which he equated fairs in Brody with those in Lublin and Toruń, granted staple right and exempted city residents from taxes for 15 years. Under the patronage of Koniecpolski, the city flourished. In 1637 he founded a school in which he employed lecturers from the Kraków Academy, Poland's leading university. Its first director was Jan Marcinkowski. In 1643 he founded a silk and wool fabric manufacture in the city, one of the leading manufactories of this type throughout Poland. Stanisław Koniecpolski died in Brody on 11 March 1646. On 30 June funeral ceremonies took place in Brody.

In 1648, during the Cossack uprising, the castle took eight weeks for Bohdan Khmelnytsky to capture. Notably, according to the book History of the Rus, the town's Jewish population was spared after the sack. The Cossacks destroyed and plundered the city. The Jews of Brody were found not to have been engaged in alleged maltreatment of the Orthodox Christian (Rus) population and were only required to pay a "moderate tribute" in kind.

In 1704, Brody was purchased by Potocki family. In 1734 the fortress was destroyed by Russian troops and was later replaced by Stanisław Szczęsny Potocki's palace in the Baroque style.

Austrian Empire

As a result of the First Partition of Poland, in 1772, Brody became a part of Habsburg Empire (from 1804 the Austrian Empire). During the Austro-Polish War (part of Polish national liberation fights), on 27 May 1809, the city was captured by Poles without a fight. In 1812, Wincenty Potocki was forced by the Austrian government to remove the city's fortifications. In 1817 a secondary school (Realschule) was founded in Brody, transformed in 1865 into a gymnasium. After the liberalization of Austrian policies in the Austrian Partition of Poland, after 1904 German was gradually replaced by Polish at this school.

Polish Republic
In 1919, Brody became part of the Second Polish Republic, after Poland regained independence a year earlier. It was the site of a battle during the Polish-Soviet War of 1920 and heavy destruction by both Polish and Russian forces, and is described extensively in stories of the Red Cavalry by Isaac Babel. Administratively Brody was the seat of Brody County located in the Tarnopol Voivodeship. Brody was an important military base, with the Kresowa Cavalry Brigade headquarters established there. In 1936, the People's University in Brody (Uniwersytet Ludowy w Brodach) was founded for farmers from the surrounding area.

World War II
After the Soviet invasion of Poland, during World War II, in September 1939, Brody was occupied by the Red Army. The Soviets deported mainly Polish people deep into the USSR. Between 26 and 30 June 1941, a tank battle was fought nearby between the German Panzer Group 1 and five Soviet mechanized corps with heavy losses on both sides. From 1941 to 1944 it was occupied by Germany. The local Jews were murdered in the Holocaust (see below). During July–August 1944, Brody and nearby areas saw the battles of the strategically important Lvov-Sandomierz Operation (a.k.a. Brodovkiy Kotel) where the Soviet army successfully encircled and destroyed German forces. It was occupied by the Soviets again, and in 1945 it was taken from Poland and annexed to the USSR.

The Jews in Brody 

A crossroads and a Jewish trade center in the 19th century, the city is considered to be one of the shtetls. It was particularly famous for the Brodersänger or Broder singers, who were among the first to publicly perform Yiddish songs outside of Purim plays and wedding parties.

The promulgation of the May Laws, and the massive exodus of Russian Jews which was its result, took the leaders of Western Jewry completely by surprise. Throughout 1881, hundreds of immigrants kept arriving in Brody daily. Their arrival placed the existing Austrian and German-influenced ethnic Jews in a quandary. The comfortable middle-class Jewish community of Central and Western Europe looked instinctively to the Alliance Israélite Universelle, the world's largest and most respected Jewish philanthropic agency, to bring order out of chaos, to cope with the huge influx of newcomers.

Throughout centuries of Jewish life in Brody until the murderous events of the Holocaust, Jews and Gentiles lived a mostly segregated life, with distinct and separate social as well as religious life.

Holocaust in Brody 

When German troops occupied the city on 1 July 1941, the Jewish population of some 9,000 was forced to wear an arm band with the yellow badge. Two hundred fifty intellectuals were arrested on 15 July 1941 and shot two days later at the Jewish cemetery after being brutally tortured. Encouraged by German occupation authorities, the Ukrainian population started a pogrom in August 1941, looting Jewish possessions. The Judenrat had to provide labor for repairs and maintenance on the roads and bridges as well as for work in army depots. From December 1941 young people were arrested on the streets and sent to forced labor camps in the vicinity.

In September 1942 the Aktion Reinhardt started in Brody, leaving 300 people dead. Two thousand people were deported to Bełżec where they would be murdered in the gas chambers. In December 1942 the German occupiers forced the Jewish population to resettle in a ghetto inside the town, where 6,000 people lived in January 1943. During 1943, Aktion Reinhardt was continued with thousands being killed in the nearby woods in March and April, the Ghetto being liquidated on 21 May 1943. More than 3,000 inhabitants were deported, presumably to Majdanek, but hundreds had already been killed in the Ghetto. Many houses were set on fire to drive out those who had remained hidden there.

After the war 
During the Cold War, Brody air base served Soviet Air Force regiments, while the city was noticeably militarized. Parts of the city to this day are being referred to as Bili Kazarmy (the White Barracks) and as Chervoni Kazarmy (the Red Barracks).

The Brody Museum of History and District Ethnography was founded in 2001.

Until 18 July 2020, Brody was the administrative center of Brody Raion. The raion was abolished in July 2020 as part of the administrative reform of Ukraine, which reduced the number of raions in Lviv Oblast to seven. The area of Brody Raion was merged into Zolochiv Raion.

Climate

Gallery

Notable people
 Adolph Baller, pianist
 Iuliu Barasch, physician
 Aryeh Leib Bernstein (1708–1788), Chief Rabbi of Galicia
 Berl Broder (Berl Margulis), singer
 Oscar Chajes, chess player
 Zvi Hirsch Chajes, rabbi and talmudist
 Petro Fedun-Poltava (1919–1951), ideologist of Ukrainian national liberation fight 1940–50 years
 Kalman Kahana (1910–1991), Israeli politician
 Leo Kanner, Austrian psychiatrist and physician known for his work related to autism
 Hans Kelsen (father's birthplace)
 Shlomo Kluger, rabbi
 Stanisław Koniecpolski, Polish military commander, magnate, and royal official
 , Polish writer
 Nachman Krochmal, Jewish philosopher
 Yechezkel Landau, rabbi
 Max Margules, meteorologist
 Fabius Mieses (1824–1898), writer
 Jacques Mieses, with parents from Brody; he was born in Leipzig
 Nachman of Horodenka, Hasidic leader
 Amalia Nathansohn-Freud (1835–1930), mother of Sigmund Freud
 Dmytro Pyluk (1900–1985), Ukrainian painter and film producer 
 Joseph Ludwig Raabe, mathematician
 Elazar Rokeach, rabbi
 Jakob Rosanes, mathematician
 Joseph Roth (1894–1939), writer
 Dov Sadan (1902–1989), scholar of Yiddish literature, Hebrew Literature and Jewish Folklore
 Myron Tarnavskiy (1869–1938), general of Ukrainian Galychina Army
 Ivan Trush (1869–1941), Ukrainian artist
  (1846–1946), Polish publisher
 Daniel Abraham Yanofsky, chess player. See German-language article.
 Israel Zolli, former Chief Rabbi of Rome who converted to Catholicism
 Oksana Lyniv, Ukrainian conductor, since February 2017 is a chief conductor of the Graz Opera

Nearby towns
 Zolochiv
 Oles'ko
 Pidhirtsi (Szwaby, Schwabendorf), German settlement
 Busk
 Pidkamin
 Zboriv
 Berezhany

See also 
 Odessa–Brody pipeline

References

Notes

Sources
 Howard M. Sachar, The Course of modern Jewish history. Vintage Books (a division of Random House) Chapter 15
 Kuzmany, Börries, Brody: A Galician Border City in the Long Nineteenth Century (Brill, Leiden/Boston 2017). The German version is open access: Kuzmany, Börries: Brody. Eine galizische Grenzstadt im langen 19. Jahrhundert (Böhlau, Vienna/Cologne/Weimar 2011).  (PDF; 16,9 MB)

External links

 Brody in the Encyclopedia of Ukraine
  Brody in the Geographical Dictionary of the Kingdom of Poland (1880)
  About Brody museum
  Brody site 
 
  ShtetLinks Site for Brody
  Brody under Austrian Rule
  Photo Gallery of Brody (1.03.2008, 51 photos)
 Live webcam of the Market Square (ploshcha Rynok).

 
Cities in Lviv Oblast
Cities of district significance in Ukraine
Magdeburg rights
Shtetls
Populated places in the Kingdom of Galicia and Lodomeria
Tarnopol Voivodeship
Holocaust locations in Ukraine
Former border crossings
Austrian Empire–Russian Empire border
Jewish communities destroyed in the Holocaust